The 1976 New Zealand Grand Prix was a motor race held at Pukekohe Park Raceway on 4 January 1976.  The race, which had 12 starters, was the opening round of the 1976 Peter Stuyvesant Series.

It was the 22nd New Zealand Grand Prix, and the first time the race was not run with the Tasman Series since 1964. New Zealander Ken Smith won his first New Zealand Grand Prix in his Lola T332 and thereby became the first New Zealander to win the race since Chris Amon back in 1969. The rest of the podium was completed by Australians Bruce Allison and Kevin Bartlett.

Classification

References

Grand Prix
New Zealand Grand Prix
January 1976 sports events in New Zealand